Andrei Nikolayevich Maximishin (born 20 December 1984) is a Russian former competitive ice dancer. With Anastasia Platonova, he is the 2006 Karl Schäfer Memorial silver medalist and won three gold medals on the ISU Junior Grand Prix series.

Career 
Early in his career, Maximishin had brief partnerships with Jana Khokhlova and Olga Orlova.

Maximishin competed with Anastasia Platonova from 2003 to 2007. They placed 6th at the 2005 World Junior Championships and 5th in 2006, as well as competing twice at the ISU Junior Grand Prix Final. Platonova and Maximishin placed 5th at 2006 Skate Canada International, their senior Grand Prix debut. They parted ways due to Platonova's back problem. They were coached by Alexei Gorshkov in Odintsovo.

Maximishin teamed up with Natalia Mikhailova in mid-2007, moving to her coach Alexander Zhulin. They competed together during the 2007-2008 season and won the silver medal at the 2007 Golden Spin of Zagreb.

Programs 
(with Platonova)

Competitive highlights 
GP: Grand Prix; JGP: Junior Grand Prix

With Mikhailova

With Platonova

With Orlova

With Khokhlova

References

External links

 
 

Russian male ice dancers
Figure skaters at the 2007 Winter Universiade
1984 births
Living people
Figure skaters from Moscow
Medalists at the 2007 Winter Universiade
Universiade medalists in figure skating
Universiade silver medalists for Russia